The Banu 'l-Ukhaidhir, informally as Ukhaydhirites, was an Arab dynasty that ruled in Najd and al-Yamamah (central Arabia) from 867 to at least the mid-eleventh century.  An Alid dynasty, they were descendants of Muhammad through his daughter Fatimah and his grandson Al-Hasan, and at least one contemporary traveler describes them as having been Shi'ites of the Zaydi persuasion. Their capital was known as al-Khidhrimah, which lay near the present-day city of Al-Kharj in Saudi Arabia.

History

The founder of the dynasty was Muhammad ibn Yusuf al-Ukhaidhir ibn Ibrahim ibn Musa al-Djawn ibn Abd Allah al-Kāmil ibn Al-Hasan al-Mu'thannā bin Al-Hassan al-mujtaba bin Ali al Murtaza bin Abi Talib. Muhammad's brother Isma'il had launched a rebellion in the Tihamah in 865 against the Abbasid government and temporarily occupied the city of Mecca. After Isma'il's death the following year, Muhammad began stirring up trouble along the road running between the Hejaz and Iraq, but was defeated by the road's governor Abu 'l-Saj Dewdad. Fleeing from the government forces, he made his way in al-Yamamah and established himself there in 867.

Al-Yamamah at the time was nominally part of the Abbasid Caliphate, but the central government had largely neglected the area for years due to its remoteness. With the exception of the occasional raid by government forces, the tribes there were largely self-governing. When Muhammad arrived in al-Yamamah, he likely gained the support of the Banu Hanifa, the largest tribe in the area, and created an independent amirate.

It is not known how much of al-Yamamah was ruled by Muhammad and his descendants. Descriptions of the extent of the amirate by medieval Muslim historians vary; one source states that it controlled only al-Khidhrimah and its outskirts, while another claims that it ruled over a territory that extended as far north as Qurran.

The early rule of the Banu 'l-Ukhaidhir was characterized by a sustained economic depression. Thousands of people are recorded as having emigrated from al-Yamamah to various provinces of the caliphate in order to escape the turmoil. Muhammad has been blamed for this period of hardship due to his oppressive rule, although it has been noted that reports of mass emigration from al-Yamamah began years before his arrival.

Muhammad was succeeded as amir by his son Yusuf, who was himself succeeded by his son Isma'il. Isma'il established an alliance with the powerful Qarmatians of neighboring Al-Hasa. He participated in the capture of Kufa in 925 and was given command of the town by the Qarmatian leader Abu Tahir. Relations between the two sides, however, subsequently soured, and in 928 Isma'il and several members of his family were killed in a battle with the Qarmatians.

Isma'il was succeeded by his son al-Hasan, and at this point the amirate likely subordinate to the Qarmatians. After the rule of al-Hasan's son Ahmad, the history of the Banu 'l-Ukhaidhir becomes obscure. When the traveler Nasir-i Khusraw arrived in al-Yamamah in 1051, the Banu 'l-Ukhaidhir were still ruling there, but at some point after this the Banu Kilab took over the country.

Rulers
 Muhammad ibn Yusuf al-Ukhaidhir (from 866)
 Yusuf ibn Muhammad
 Isma'il ibn Yusuf (to 928)
 Al-Hasan ibn Yusuf
 Ahmad ibn al-Hasan
 Abu 'l-Muqallid Ja'far
 Descendants of Abu 'l-Muqallid Ja'far

After Ahmad, the list of rulers becomes uncertain, but later amirs were descendants of his son Abu 'l-Muqallid Ja'far.

See also
 Alids
 List of Shi'a Muslim dynasties

Notes

References
Al-Askar, Abdullah. Al-Yamama in the Early Islamic Era. Reading, UK: Ithaca Press, 2002. 
Al-Juhany, Uwaidah M. Najd Before the Salafi Reform Movement: Social, Political, and Religious Conditions During the Three Centuries Preceding the Rise of the Saudi State. Reading, UK: Ithaca Press, 2002. 
Madelung, W. "Banu Saj." Encyclopaedia Iranica. Ed. Ehsan Yarshater. Columbia University. Retrieved 21 August 2011.

Al-Mas'udi, Ali ibn al-Husain. Les Prairies D'Or, Tome Septieme. Trans. C. Barbier de Meynard. Paris: Imprimerie Nationale, 1873.

History of Nejd
Middle Eastern royal families
Hasanid dynasties
Shia dynasties
Zaydis
Arab slave owners